Mark Borkowski (born 1959 in Stroud, Gloucestershire) is a British PR agent and author with an interest in the history of public relations and the art of the publicity stunt. He attended King's Stanley Junior School and St Peters High School in Gloucester and began working in public relations at nineteen years old. As founder and head of Borkowski PR, he is a well-known tv pundit,  lecturer and speaker on the art of publicity. Borkowski has a column in The Guardian and has written two books on publicity stunts as related to public relations and has won several awards for his work.

Career
Borkowski's first job was as the in-house publicist at the Wyvern Theatre, Swindon promoting touring productions and producing poetry and rock events. He moved on to the Theatre Royal, Stratford East, in 1981. The first production he promoted was Nell Dunn's Steaming, starring Brenda Blethyn. One of his early publicity stunts there was to "kill off" a tap-dancing dog that he had invented to promote an amateur variety night. He also produced more music and performance poetry events.

He founded Borkowski PR in 1987. The company works on consumer brands, celebrity and arts and entertainment. They have worked with Michael Jackson (briefly), Noel Edmonds, Graham Norton, Van Morrison, Carlos Acosta, Joan Rivers, Macaulay Culkin, Sir Cliff Richard, Bolshoi Ballet, Cirque du Soleil, The Three Tenors, Eddie Izzard, Led Zeppelin, Stomp, Michael Flatley, Virgin Megastore, Horlicks, American Express, Oxfam, Amnesty, Selfridges, Vodafone, Harrods, Cadbury, Mamma Mia! and Sony UK Ltd amongst others.

Borkowski has had a long association with the Edinburgh Festival; to publicise Archaos, the grunge circus, he organised a series of jumps on motorbikes over traffic queues in the centre of Edinburgh in 1988 and staged the first UK Cowpat flinging competition to launch Hank Wangford at the Festival in 1989.

In the 1990s, Borkowski worked for television shows such as The Word, Never Mind the Buzzcocks, Our Friends in the North and Cracker.  Borkowski is now a regular TV and radio pundit on PR, the media and celebrity, often attacking the celebrity industry whilst still working within it. He lectures to the industry, to corporate trade associations and at academic institutions.  His column, Stuntwatch, appears on The Guardian Online.

His views about the future for the public relations industry centre around poorly trained staff, low quality awards ceremonies and a desire to keep PR "potent and relevant" and to continue to take risks for his clients.

Controversy
In 1994 Borkowski created a cause celebre and front page outrage when he publicised the London production of the controversial religious rock musical Bad Boy Johnny and the Prophets of Doom. In 1996 Borkowski ran a "wild, rock'n’roll campaign" for Carlsberg-Tetley's Thickhead brand of alcopops that resulted in a huge media backlash against alcopops, which were already controversial, and the withdrawal of the product within hours of its launch. The press attention he and his company generated for Archaos in 1990, following tabloid coverage of "nude trapeze artists and men dancing together", stirred Bristol Council into banning the circus from appearing on the downs.

Celebrity
Borkowski is responsible for helping to revive Noel Edmonds' career and helped deal with the press at Edmonds' recent wedding, which was notable in that the photo rights were deliberately not sold to a celebrity magazines such as Hello! and OK!. Borkowski has also acted for celebrities in court, coaching them before they appear – notably in divorce cases for Slavica Ecclestone and Karen Parlour in her divorce from Ray Parlour. Cliff Richard brought in Borkowski to work on the musical Heathcliff and Borkowski also ran the campaign to get the singer's "The Millennium Prayer"  to number one on the UK singles chart, despite minimal radio airplay.

Publicity stunts
Borkowski has written two books on the subject of publicity stunts. His own stunts include planting a field full of Cabbage Patch Kids for Hasbro, gift wrapping a house and helicopter, commissioning the world's first chocolate billboard for Thorntons staging a ballet of remote controlled vacuum cleaners and creating a newspaper column for a cat. (for Bacardi Breezer) Borkowski was allegedly once expelled from the BBC for letting scorpions loose in a Green Room to promote the Jim Rose Sideshow tour in the UK; he also arranged for the question writer to walk an elephant into a betting shop to promote Trivial Pursuit. In 1988, he helped Ian Botham recreate Hannibal's walk across the Alps, again with elephants. In 2000, he held a World Record Custard Pie Fight, involving 1,000 people, at the Millennium Dome.

Awards
Borkowski received an Outstanding Achievement award from Fringe Report in 2006, citing him for creating "a new branch of theatre – theatre of publicity" and from World's Fair, the circus industry's trade paper, for services to the circus in 2001. His company won the Gold Award from PR Week for Campaign of the Year in 2008 for their Wispa social networking campaign to relaunch the chocolate bar.

Books
Borkowski has written two histories of public relations, focusing in particular on the art of the publicity stunt. Improperganda was published in 2001. The Fame Formula started life as Sons of Barnum (a show by Borkowski at the Edinburgh Festival in 2004) and was subtitled: How Hollywood's fixers, fakers and star makers shaped the publicity industry. It sparked controversy when The Times suggested that one of the fakers and star makers in question, Maynard Nottage, was himself a fake, i.e. that he never existed. Borkowksi, according to the paper, may himself have been the victim of an elaborate hoax. Borkowski confirmed his belief in Nottage's existence and wrote that "Nottage's rough collection of papers, the majority of which were written in hindsight in the 1940s and 50s, were handed to me after lengthy negotiation with his cautious family, just prior to writing The Fame Formula, at the beginning of 2007."

The Fame Formula received mixed reviews; the Guardian said that the Fame Formula "is a terrific, witty romp through the – often dirty – undies of the Hollywood fame factory and draws some interesting conclusions about modern-day celebrity culture," but a harsh critique from The Scotsman's book club led Borkowski to respond with a gift-wrapped pig's anus for each of the reviewers, a stunt borrowed from one of the publicists in the book, Jim Moran.

References

External links
Mark My Words Mark Borkowski blogs
A Life in the Day of Mark Borkowski The Times

Living people
British public relations people
1959 births
People from Stroud